The Monogram Murders is a mystery novel by British writer Sophie Hannah, based on characters created by Agatha Christie. It is the first in her series of Hercule Poirot novels, after being authorised by the estate of Agatha Christie to write new stories for the character. The novel was followed by Closed Casket (2016), The Mystery of Three Quarters (2018), and The Killings at Kingfisher Hall (2020).

Plot summary

Poirot is taking a holiday from private-detective work, though in fact he has only travelled to the guest house nearest his London flat; he can even see the flat from the house's parlour window. One evening, while waiting for his dinner in a coffee house he frequents, he is confronted by a distressed young woman who tells him that she is "already dead... or will be soon", but that he absolutely must not pursue her killer. "The crime must never be solved", she pleads.

The next day brings news that three seemingly unconnected people have been murdered in their rooms at the Bloxham Hotel, each with a cuff-link placed carefully in their mouths, and engraved with the initials "PIJ". Furthermore, the staff are alerted to the murders and room numbers by a note left at the front desk, reading "MAY THEY NEVER REST IN PEACE. 121. 238. 317." Poirot, enlisted by investigating Scotland Yard officer Edward Catchpool, whom he meets staying at the same guest house, takes the case, and gradually uncovers a complex web of bigotry, hate, and vengeance.

Plot
Whilst waiting for his dinner at Pleasant's Coffee House, Hercule Poirot meets a young woman named Jennie. She confides in Poirot that she will soon be murdered, and that nothing can be done to stop it; after refusing Poirot's assistance, Jennie departs in distress, and Poirot is unable to find out anymore information from the staff about Jennie or her address. After returning to the guest house where he is staying, Poirot describes the events to Edward Catchpool, an officer at Scotland Yard - Catchpool reveals that he has spent the day investigating three murders at the luxurious Bloxham Hotel; two women and a man, all in separate rooms, were found dead earlier in the evening, each with a monogrammed cufflink (with the letters 'PJI') in their mouths.

The following day, Poirot and Catchpool attend the scene of the crime where they discover more details about the victims with the hotel's owner, Luca Lazzari; the victims (Harriet Sippel, Ida Gransbury and Richard Negus) had all arrived at the hotel separately on the same day; each victim was found in their locked hotel rooms; the murders occurred between 19:15 and 20:10 (all three victims were seen alive at 19:15 by hotel staff); Mr. Negus had booked the rooms for all three victims and paid for them ahead of time; a junior clerk saw Mr. Negus in the reception area 15 minutes after room service was provided for the victims. Later on, it's revealed that all three victims had lived in a village called Great Holling, and that Mr. Negus had been engaged to Ida - in addition, Richard had left Great Holling in 1913 after the deaths of the village vicar and his wife, Patrick and Frances Ives. Poirot sends Catchpool to Great Holling to discover more information about the victims. After arriving in the village, Catchpool meets Margaret Ernst, widow of the most recent vicar for the village. After some reluctance, Margaret relays to Catchpool the events of 1913. The vicar's maid had told Harriet Sippel a rumour that the vicar was taking money from villagers to help them 'communicate' with deceased loved ones. Harriet spread the rumour around the village, with the support of Ida and Mr. Negus. The rumours spiralled until there were calls to remove Ives as Vicar, and Frances' health declined as a result. Eventually, unable to bear the rumours any longer, Frances took her own life, with the heartbroken vicar following shortly afterwards. After some questioning, Catchpool learns that the maid who told the original lie was Jennie Hobbs - the same Jennie that Poirot has been searching for all this time.

Meanwhile, as Catchpool is leaving London, Poirot arranges to meet with Nancy Ducane, a famous artist who was seen to be leaving the hotel shortly after the murders - Nancy was also mentioned in Margaret's story as the villager seen to be visiting the church at night with Ives. During the visit, Nancy recognises the names of various Great Holling residents but refuses to provide anymore details. However, Poirot and Constable Stanley Beer find a pair of keys that correspond to two of the victims' hotel rooms. Whilst visiting the home of Nancy's friend to confirm her alibi, Poirot notes several details from different paintings within the house.
Shortly after returning home, Poirot learns from Scotland Yard that a fourth murder has occurred at the Bloxham - with Catchpool, the two gentlemen return to the hotel - they find a pool of blood, a monogrammed cufflink and (to Poirot's dismay) Jennie's hat within the room.
After returning to their guest house, Poirot and Catchpool are visited by Nancy, who confesses her connection to the events in Great Holling; she was having an affair with Ives, and Jennie - who was also in love with the vicar - had spread the rumours out of jealousy. Nancy's attempts to placate the villagers by telling the truth were dismissed, and indeed further ruined the reputation of the vicar.
The following day, Poirot takes Catchpool to visit the address of Samuel Kidd, the witness who saw Nancy at the hotel. However, instead of Samuel, they are greeted by Jennie Hobbs who - Poirot reveals - was formerly engaged to Samuel before she met the vicar. After listening to her testimony, Poirot and Catchpool return to Great Holling in response to a serious attack on Margaret - after speaking with the village doctor, Ambrose Flowerday, Poirot decides to return to the Bloxham one last time to resolve the case. 

At the hotel, Poirot gathers the hotel staff and suspects together to reveal the solution; Nancy Ducane and Jennie Hobbs (with Kidd's assistance) had conspired to kill the three victims. Nancy & Kidd had impersonated Harriet & Mr. Negus at 19.15, and Kidd was the gentleman seen by the clerk at the front desk at 19.30. Nancy confesses to the crimes, but is fatally stabbed by Jennie.
At Scotland Yard, Jennie, confesses her side of the story; In 1913, the rumour that Jennie had created was actually intended to save Ives from the scandal of his affair with Nancy. Harriet was convinced that the vicar could help her speak to her dead husband, and upon being refused, viciously spread the rumour in Great Holling. Years later, Mr. Negus contacted Jennie out of remorse for his actions, and the two people hatched a plan to kill all four guilty parties involved in the rumour. Mr. Negus and Jennie would lure Harriet and Ida to the Bloxham under false pretenses and poison them separately; Mr. Negus would then poison Jennie, and finally himself. However, Jennie secretly revealed the plan to Nancy to avoid her own death, and convinced Richard to die before her so that she could find justice against Nancy. Mr. Negus agreed to this plan, and Jennie arranged the scene to look like Mr. Negus had killed himself. Jennie had killed Nancy after she revealed at the meeting that her relationship with Ives had been a physical one, rather than the chaste romance that Jennie had been led to believe.

Four days after Jennie and Kidd's arrest, Poirot and Catchpool receive a letter from Dr Flowerday and Margaret Ernst; they have harboured feelings for each other for years, and after Poirot's intervention have decided to marry.

Characters

London
 Hercule Poirot - Renowned Belgian detective. Whilst taking a short break away from his London Flat, Poirot becomes involved a murder case at the Bloxham Hotel.
 Edward Catchpool - An officer at Scotland Yard staying at the same guest house as Poirot, and the narrator of the story. Initially involved in the murder case, Catchpool later assists Poirot in his investigation.
 Blanche Unsworth - Owner of the guest house in which Poirot and Catchpool are staying.
 Luca Lazzari - The eccentric owner of the Bloxham Hotel.
 Jennie Hobbs - A young woman who Poirot meets at the beginning of the story - she is convinced of her impending murder. Jennie formerly lived in Great Holling and worked for the Ives' - she harboured a love for Patrick Ives.
 Nancy Ducane - An attractive woman in her 40's, and a renowned artist. Nancy formerly lived in Great Holling and was in love with the village Vicar.
 Euphemia 'Fee' Spring - Owner of Pleasant's Coffee House - she impresses Poirot with her eye for details.
 St John Wallace - Artistic rival to Nancy Ducane.
 Lady Louise Wallace - Friend of Nancy Ducane and Jennie Hobb's former employer.
 Henry Negus - Brother to Richard Negus. He visits London to collect his brother's affairs after the murders.

Great Holling
 Patrick Ives - Former vicar of Great Holling, he was the subject of a vicious rumour spread by Harriet Sippel. This rumour lead to the death of his wife and himself in 1913.
 Frances Ives - Wife to Patrick, she is severely affected by the rumour surrounding her husband and kills herself.
 Harriet Sippel - One of the victims at the Bloxham Hotel. Once a kind and caring woman, Harriet became a spiteful gossip after the early death of her husband George and was determined to find the bad qualities in others - Harriet was responsible for initially spreading the rumour.
 Ida Gransbury - One of the victims at the Bloxham Hotel. An extremely pious woman and Richard's former fiancée, Ida supported Harriet in spreading the rumour about the Ives'.
 Richard Negus - One of the victims at the Bloxham Hotel. A wealthy lawyer and Ida's former fiancé, Richard initially supported the rumour about the Ives', but after their deaths he left Great Holling, breaking off his engagement and feeling guilty about his involvement ever since. 
 Dr. Ambrose Flowerday - Doctor for Great Holling. One of the few villagers to support the Ives', he continues to preserve their names after their deaths.
 Margaret Ernst - Widow of the former Vicar. Whilst she was not present for the events of 1913, Margaret took it upon herself to safeguard the Ives' gravestone from sceptical villagers.
 Victor Meakin - Owner of the King's Head Inn, he is reluctant to give any information about the murder victims.
 Walter Stoakley - A drunken old man at the King's Head Inn, Stoakley is later revealed to be Frances Ives' father.

Reviews

Continuity with Christie's original stories
The novel is set in 1929, placing it shortly after The Mystery of the Blue Train, published 1928, and roughly three years before Peril at End House, published 1932. It is therefore set in a relatively early stage of Poirot's long career after he settled in England as a refugee from the Great War, following a distinguished career in his native Belgium.

Poirot's occasional sidekick and chronicler Arthur Hastings is absent from this novel; here, his shoes are filled by thirty-two-year-old Scotland Yard policeman Edward Catchpool, who, like Hastings, serves as the first-person narrator. Hannah has stated that she wanted to avoid reusing any of Christie's supporting cast.

Commissioning by Agatha Christie estate
The Monogram Murders is the first original novel including Hercule Poirot to be commissioned by the Christie estate, more than thirty-eight years after her death in 1976. It is the thirty-fourth novel to feature the character. Agatha Christie wrote her last Poirot novel, Elephants Can Remember, in 1972. The last featuring Poirot and written by Christie was Curtain: Poirot's Last Case, published 1975 but written in the 1940s to be a swansong.

References

External links
The Monogram Murders on the official Sophie Hannah website
The Monogram Murders on the official Agatha Christie website

2014 British novels
HarperCollins books
Hercule Poirot novels
Novels set in the 1920s
Novels set in London
Interquel novels